is a Japanese voice actress affiliated with Tokyo Actor's Consumer's Cooperative Society.

Career
A group member of Hamiradi, Miho Arakawa attended Haikyo Voice Actors Studio and was part of the 36th graduating class. Arakawa worked as a nurse until 2011.

Personal life
In July 2022, Arakawa announced her marriage and pregnancy with her first child.

Filmography

Anime series

Anime films

Video games

Audio dramas

References

External links
  
 
  

1987 births
Living people
Japanese video game actresses
Japanese voice actresses
Tokyo Actor's Consumer's Cooperative Society voice actors
Voice actresses from Miyagi Prefecture
21st-century Japanese actresses